Edward Ernest Perrian Bovington (born 23 April 1941) is an English former footballer who played for West Ham United as a right-half.

Bovington played junior football with West Ham, and was a member of the FA Youth Cup Final team of 1958–59 alongside Bobby Moore, Harry Cripps and Jack Burkett.

He made his senior debut in a Football League match against Manchester United on 18 April 1960, although it was to be another 18 months before his second game. His cup debut was in the Football League Cup against Rotherham United on 16 October 1962. Bovington made a total of 138 League appearances for West Ham, scoring a single league goal (against Nottingham Forest on 26 October 1966 at Upton Park). He made another 46 senior appearances for the Hammers in other competitions, including the 1964 FA Cup Final and eight European Cup Winners Cup matches. His only cup goal was against Cardiff City, in a 5–2 home win on 20 December 1965 in the League Cup semi-final.

He retired from football, aged 28, to join the rag trade. He later became a keen marathon runner and member of Woodford Green Athletics Club. Bovington later recalled that he had had a poor relationship with manager, Ron Greenwood and that Greenwood had failed to pick Bovington for the team as he thought he was not good enough.

Career statistics

Honours
West Ham United
FA Cup: 1963–64
FA Charity Shield: 1964

References

1941 births
Living people
English footballers
West Ham United F.C. players
Association football midfielders
Footballers from Edmonton, London
English Football League players
FA Cup Final players